Phindisile Pretty Xaba-Ntshaba is a South African politician who was elected to the National Assembly of South Africa in the 2019 general election as a member of the African National Congress.

Since becoming an MP, Xaba-Ntshaba has served on the Portfolio Committee on Cooperative Governance and Traditional Affairs.

References

External links

Profile at Parliament of South Africa

Living people
Xhosa people
People from the Eastern Cape
African National Congress politicians
Members of the National Assembly of South Africa
Women members of the National Assembly of South Africa
Year of birth missing (living people)